Watkins v. United States, 354 U.S. 178 (1957), is a decision of the Supreme Court of the United States that held that the power of the United States Congress is not unlimited in conducting investigations and that nothing in the United States Constitution gives it the authority to expose the private affairs of individuals.

Background
John Thomas Watkins, a labor union official from Rock Island, Illinois, was convicted of contempt of Congress, a misdemeanor under , for failing to answer questions posed by members of Congress during a hearing held by a subcommittee of the House of Representatives Committee on Un-American Activities on April 29, 1954. 

Watkins was born in July 1910 and ended his formal education in the eighth grade. At the time of his testimony he had four children and was working on behalf of the United Auto Workers (UAW) to unionize workers at a division of Firestone Tire and Rubber in Illinois. The UAW underwrote his legal expenses.

Watkins was asked to name people he knew to be members of the Communist Party. Watkins told the subcommittee that he did not wish to answer such questions and that they were outside the scope of the subjects on which he was summoned to testify and of the committee's jurisdiction. He said: 

His conviction carried a fine of $1000 and a one-year suspended prison sentence. Watkins first won a 3–2 decision on appeal to the US Court of Appeals for the District of Columbia but then lost, 6–2, when that court heard the case en banc. The Supreme Court heard arguments on March 7, 1957 and announced its decision on June 17, 1957.

Decision
The Supreme Court decided 6–1 to overturn Watkins' conviction. Chief Justice Earl Warren wrote for the majority. Warren noted that it is an offense for a witness to refuse to answer any question "pertinent to the question under inquiry" in testifying before a Congressional committee, but he wrote that the Court was unable to ascertain the nature of the Congressional inquiry with reasonable precision:

The New York Times commented: "The Supreme Court has placed fundamental restrictions on a Congressional investigatory power that in recent years has been asserted as all but limitless."

Senators James Eastland and William E. Jenner, who played principal roles in investigating left-wing activities, issued a statement accusing the Court of contributing to "the trend of the past year of undermining our existent barriers against Communist subversion."

The decision's impact was limited in that the Court limited the application of the principles it espoused in Watkins.

See also
List of United States Supreme Court cases
List of United States Supreme Court cases by the Warren Court
List of United States Supreme Court cases, volume 354
List of United States Supreme Court cases involving the First Amendment

References

External links 
 

United States Supreme Court cases
United States Supreme Court cases of the Warren Court
United States freedom of association case law
1957 in United States case law
American Civil Liberties Union litigation
Communist Party USA litigation
McCarthyism
History of the United Auto Workers